Tianzhu, meaning "Heavenly Master" or "Lord of Heaven", was the Chinese word used by the Jesuit China missions to designate God.

History
The word first appeared in Michele Ruggieri's Chinese translation of the Decalogo, or Ten Commandments. In 1584, Ruggieri and Matteo Ricci published their first catechism, Tiānzhǔ shílù (天主實錄, The Veritable Record of the Lord of Heaven).

Matteo Ricci later wrote a catechism entitled Tiānzhŭ Shíyì (天主實義, The True Meaning of the Lord of Heaven).

Following the Chinese rites controversy, the term Tiānzhŭ was officially adopted by the Pope in 1715, who rejected alternative terms such as Tiān (天, "Heaven") and Shàngdì (上帝, "Supreme Emperor").

"Catholicism" is most commonly rendered as Tiānzhǔjiào (天主教, "Religion of the Lord of Heaven").  An individual Catholic is Tiānzhŭjiào tú; tú includes the meanings "disciple" and "believer." The same hanja characters are used in the Korean words for Catholicism and Catholic believer.

See also
 Chinese rites controversy    
 Names of God
 Names of God in China
 Shangdi  
 Shen (Chinese religion)
 Tian

References

Further reading
 Vincent Cronin (1955), The Wise Man from the West:  Matteo Ricci and His Mission to China, New York:  Dutton.
 天主 (中國)

Catholicism in China
Names of God